Alair is a town in Yadadri Bhuvanagiri district of the Indian state of Telangana. It is a municipality and one of the constituencies in the Yadadri Bhuvanagiri district. It is located in Alair mandal of Bhongir revenue division.
Alair is known for its Kulpakji Jain temple, and also known as the birthplace of Renukacharya, (also known as Revaṇārādhya or Revaṇasiddha) one of the five acharyas who came in the Kali Yuga to teach and preach Vīraśaivism.

Geography 

It has an average elevation of 361 metres (1187 ft).

Government and politics 

Alair municipality is the local self-government, constituted on 1 August 2018, by merging Alair and Bahadurpeta gram panchayats. Alair falls under Alair assembly constituency of Telangana Legislative Assembly, which is one of the segments of Bhongir Lok Sabha constituency.

Transport 

Aler is well connected by roadways which passes from Hyderabad to Warangal. The Telangana State Road Transport Corporation public transport buses to major destinations from Aler. Aler Railway Station is Located in Telangana. It belongs to South Central Railway.

References 

Cities and towns in Yadadri Bhuvanagiri district
Mandal headquarters in Yadadri Bhuvanagiri district